The California halibut or California flounder (Paralichthys californicus) is a large-tooth flounder native to the waters of the Pacific Coast of North America from the Quillayute River in Washington to Magdalena Bay in Baja California.  It feeds near shore and is free swimming. It typically weighs 6 to 30 pounds (3 to 23 kg). It is much smaller than the larger and more northern-ranging Pacific halibut that can reach 300 pounds (140 kg).

This is an unusual fish in that one eye has to migrate around from one side to the other as it grows from an upright fry or baby fish into an adult fish that lies on its side.  The adult has two eyes on the up-side as it lies on the bottom. Most flatfish are generally either right-eyed or left-eyed, but the California halibut is unusual in having a roughly even number of each type. Like other flatfish, the halibut hides under sand or loose gravel and blends into the bottom.

References

External links
 Dr. Larry Allen of CSUN.edu on California Halibut
 California Halibut is key fish of oldest fishing tournament in Southern California - MDR Halibut Derby
 Tips for California Halibut fishing.
 California World Record Halibut

Further reading
Miller, D.L. and R.N. Lea. 1972. Guide to the coastal marine fishes of California. Calif. Dept. Fish and Game, Fish Bull. 157. 299 p
Oda, D. 1991. Development of eggs and larvae of California halibut Paralichthys californicus and fantail sole Xystreurys liolepis (Pisces: Paralichthyidae). Fishery Bulletin, U.S. 89:387-402.

California halibut
Fauna of California
Fauna of the Baja California Peninsula
Fish of the Gulf of California
Fish of the Western United States
Sport fish
Fauna of the San Francisco Bay Area
California halibut